While Windows Phone contains many new features, a number of capabilities and certain programs that were a part of previous versions up to Windows Mobile 6.5 were removed or changed. Until Windows Mobile 6.5, the previous version did always cover the complete feature range of the predecessor version.

The following is a list of features which were present in Windows Mobile 6.5 but were removed in Windows Phone 7.0.

Calling
 The list of past phone calls is now a single list, and cannot be separated into inbound, outbound or missed calls

Sync
 Windows Phone does not support USB sync with Microsoft Outlook's Calendar, Contacts, Tasks and Notes as opposed to older versions of Windows Mobile with Desktop ActiveSync. Syncing Contacts and Appointments is done via cloud-based services (Windows Live, Google, or Exchange Server), and no method to sync this information directly with a PC is provided.  Third-party software, such as Akruto Sync, provides some of this functionality. A petition to Microsoft was filed to reinstate USB sync for Outlook.

Other
 Adobe Flash
 Ability to open .exe files (desktop Windows executeables), such as 7-Zip 32-bit for desktop.

Features subsequently implemented in Windows Phone 7.5
 Internet sockets 
 Cut, copy, and paste 
 Partial multitasking for 3rd party apps
 Connecting to Wi-Fi (wireless) access points with hidden SSID, but without WPA
 Tethering to a computer
 Custom ringtones
 Universal email inbox
 USSD messages 
 VoIP calling through a separate app

Features subsequently implemented in Windows Phone 8.0
 Removable SD cards
 USB mass-storage 
 Bluetooth file transfers
 Connecting to Wi-Fi (wireless) access points with both a hidden SSID and WPA protection
 Sideloading for corporate apps
 VoIP and IP Videocalling integrated in the Phone app 
 Support for Office documents with security permissions
 On-device encryption 
 Strong passwords 
 Full Exchange support
 Native applications
 Full background multitasking

Features subsequently implemented in Windows Phone 8.1
 IPsec security (VPN)
 System-wide file manager
 The 'Weekly' view in the Calendar app
 Universal search
 UMTS/LTE Videocalling

See also
 List of features removed in Windows XP
 List of features removed in Windows Vista
 List of features removed in Windows 7
 List of features removed in Windows 8
 List of features removed in Windows 10

Notes

References

Features Removed In
Smartphones
Lists of mobile phones
Computing-related lists
Software features